Stephanie Coontz (born August 31, 1944) is an American author, historian, and faculty member at Evergreen State College. She teaches history and family studies and is Director of Research and Public Education for the Council on Contemporary Families, which she chaired from 2001 to 2004. Coontz has authored and co-edited several books about the history of the family and marriage.

Education and early career
Coontz earned a B.A. from the American History Honors Program (1966) at the University of California, Berkeley, where she was a member of the campus political party SLATE and participated in the civil rights movement and the Free Speech Movement. Attending the University of Washington on a Woodrow Wilson Fellowship, she earned a Master of Arts in European History (1970). Abandoning further graduate work, she joined the staff of the National Peace Action Coalition, later becoming a National Coordinator; they focused on building peaceful, legal demonstrations against the Vietnam War. Before returning to full-time teaching in 1975, Coontz also had a leadership role in the Young Socialist Alliance, a Trotskyist youth group of the Socialist Workers Party (SWP). By the late 1970s, however, Coontz had parted company with the SWP.

Academic career
In addition to her current teaching position at Evergreen, Coontz has also taught at Kobe University in Japan and the University of Hawaii at Hilo. She won the Washington Governor's Writers Award in 1989 for her book The Social Origins of Private Life: A History of American Families. In 1995 she received the Dale Richmond Award from the American Academy of Pediatrics for her "outstanding contributions to the field of child development." She received the 2001-02 "Friend of the Family" award from the Illinois Council on Family Relations. In 2004, she received the first-ever "Visionary Leadership" Award from the Council on Contemporary Families.

Coontz studies the history of American families, marriage, and changes in gender roles. Her book The Way We Never Were argues against several common myths about families of the past, including the idea that the 1950s family was traditional or the notion that families used to rely solely on their own resources. Her book, Marriage, A History: How Love Conquered Marriage, traces the history of marriage from Anthony and Cleopatra (not a love story, she argues) to debates over same-sex marriage. Her newest book, about the wives and daughters of "The Greatest Generation," is A Strange Stirring: The Feminine Mystique and American Women at the Dawn of the 1960s.

Coontz has appeared on national television and radio programs, including Oprah, the Today Show, The Colbert Report and dozens of NPR shows. In addition, her work has been featured in newspapers and magazines, as well as in many academic and professional journals. She has testified about her research before the House Select Committee on Children, Youth and Families and addressed audiences across America, Europe, and Japan.

In the landmark United States Supreme Court case Obergefell v. Hodges, Associate Justice Anthony Kennedy cited Coontz's book, Marriage, A History in their decision to grant marriage equality to same-sex couples.

Books
Coontz, Stephanie. The Way We Never Were: American Families and the Nostalgia Trap. New York: Basic Books, 1992. .
Coontz, Stephanie. The Way We Really Are: Coming to Terms with America's Changing Families. Basic Books, 1998. .
Coontz, Stephanie., ed. American Families; A Multicultural Reader. London: Routledge, 1999. .
Coontz, Stephanie. Marriage, A History: From Obedience to Intimacy, or How Love Conquered Marriage. New York: Viking Press, 2005. .
Coontz, Stephanie. A Strange Stirring: The Feminine Mystique and American Women at the Dawn of the 1960s. New York: Basic Books, 2011.

Recent essays
 "Why Gender Equality Stalled," The New York Times, February 16, 2013.
 "The Myth of Male Decline," The New York Times, September 29, 2012.
 "Can this royal marriage survive?," CNN, April 30, 2011.
 "Economic Disparity Takes Toll on Marriage," The Philadelphia Inquirer, January 9, 2011.
 "Gay marriage isn't revolutionary. It's just the next step in marriage's evolution," The Washington Post, January 7, 2011.
 "Taking Marriage Private," The New York Times, November 26, 2007.
 "The Family Revolution," Greater Good Magazine, Fall 2007.
 "Too Close for Comfort," The New York Times, November 7, 2006.
 "A Pop Quiz on Marriage," The New York Times, February 19, 2006.
 "Why Marriage Today Takes More Love and Work - From Both Partners," The Christian Science Monitor, June 28, 2005.
 "Our Kids Are Not Doomed," Los Angeles Times, May 9, 2005.
 "For Better, For Worse: Marriage Means Something Different Now," The Washington Post, May 1, 2005.

References

External links

 Stephanie Coontz's personal website
  Antonella Gambotto-Burke on Stephanie Coontz
 The Heterosexual Revolution (July 5, 2005 New York Times Op-Ed on how traditional marriage, with its long history, was upended by heterosexuals)
 Mother Jones Interview (May/June 1998)
 Stephanie Coontz interview (February/March 2013)

Feminist studies scholars
American women sociologists
American sociologists
1944 births
Living people
UC Berkeley College of Letters and Science alumni
University of Washington College of Arts and Sciences alumni
Evergreen State College faculty
Writers from Olympia, Washington
21st-century American women